Lars Lewén (born October 7, 1975 in Stockholm) is a Swedish freestyle skier, specializing in ski cross and a former alpine skier.

Lewén competed at the 2010 Winter Olympics for Sweden. He placed 19th in the qualifying round in ski cross, to advance to the knockout stages. In the first round, he finished fourth in his heat, and did not advance.

As of March 2013, his best showing at the World Championships is fifth, in 2005 and 2007.

Lewén made his World Cup debut in November 2002. As of March 2013, he has ten World Cup podiums and five victories, with the first coming in 2007/08 at Grindelwald. His best World Cup overall finish in ski cross is second, in 2007/08.

World Cup Podiums

References

1975 births
Living people
Olympic freestyle skiers of Sweden
Freestyle skiers at the 2010 Winter Olympics
Sportspeople from Stockholm
Swedish male freestyle skiers
Universiade medalists in alpine skiing
Universiade gold medalists for Sweden
Competitors at the 1999 Winter Universiade